Badong County is a county located in western Hubei province, People's Republic of China, bordering Chongqing municipality to the west. It is the northernmost county-level division under the administration of Enshi Prefecture. The Yangtze River flows through the county and the county seat is located just east of the Wu Gorge in the Three Gorges region.

Badong County is famous for the Shennong Stream gorges located near Badong town. The stream itself falls into the Yangtze opposite the Badong center city.

The Badong county seat, commonly referred to simply as "Badong", is in the town of Xinling, located on the high southern banks of the Yangtze River channel. The Yangtze valley was flooded during the first decade of the 21st century after the construction of the Three Gorges Dam to the east, but Badong county seat was mostly above the flood line, and so more of the original town survives than is the case in many other river towns along this section of the Yangtze.

Administrative divisions

Badong County is divided into 10 towns and 2 townships.

Ten towns:
 Xinling
 Dongrangkou
 Yanduhe
 Guandukou
 Chadianzi
 Lücongpo
 Dazhiping
 Yesanguan
 Qingtaiping
 Shuibuya
  
Two townships:
 Xiqiuwan
 Jinguoping

The main urban area of the county (i.e., the place typically labeled "Badong" on less-detailed maps) consists of Xinling Town—the seat of the county government—on the right (southern)  bank of the Yangtze, and the smaller Dongrangkou and Guandukou towns on the opposite side of the river. They two sides of the Yangtze are connected by the Badong Bridge.

Climate

Economy
Coal mining in small pits is the main commercial activity in the region, along with farming. There is also a large cement factory on the river to the east of the town, which is a significant polluter.

The rural population of Badong County, as with many other parts of inland China, has seen major changes in the past two decades. The Chinese government's population control policies in the 1980s and beyond resulted in a sharp drop in births, and also in a change in attitudes, making many couples uninterested in having more than one child. The new freedom to travel and work in other parts of China has also led to a major exodus of workers to the coastal areas of China to find work. The older people tend to stay in the villages, and the workers often return to have their children, but they then generally return to the factories. The overall result is that many villages in Badong are shrinking and some terraced farmland in this largely mountaintainous region is being abandoned and allowed to return to its original state.

Transportation

Due to the difficult terrain and the road conditions, the most convenient way to reach Badong's county seat is with a Yangtze riverboat. Both regular boats and hydrofoils call in the busy Badong harbor on the way up and down between Yichang and Chongqing.

The county has one Yangtze crossing, the Badong Bridge, carrying China National Highway 209.  The highway crosses the northern half of the county from the northeast to the southwest.  As of 2009, Highway 209 was little more than a dirt road for a 20-km stretch north of the bridge.

China National Highway 318 crosses the southern part of the county from the east to the west. The new G50 Shanghai–Chongqing Expressway and Yichang-Wanzhou Railway have been recently completed along the same corridor as well. The Siduhe Bridge on the new highway, located near Yesanguan town, is one of the longest bridges of its kinds; the nearby Zhijinghe Bridge is one of the world's tallest arch bridges.

The Yesanguan railway station, located near Yesanguan Town in the south-central part of the county, is the only railway station within the county. It renamed from Badong railway station to Yesanguan railway station in 2022. A high-speed rail station, Badong North railway station (now renamed Badong railway station), will open on the Zhengzhou–Wanzhou high-speed railway.

A number of provincial highways run north to south through the county.

See also
 Deng Yujiao incident; occurred in Badong in 2009

Gallery

References

External links

 Official website of Badong County Government

 
Counties of Hubei
Enshi Tujia and Miao Autonomous Prefecture